Aurora is the former train station serving the residents of Aurora, Ohio, located within Portage County, Ohio, USA. The station was constructed in 1872 by the New York, Pennsylvania and Ohio Railroad, which had absorbed the former Cleveland and Mahoning Valley Railroad, which ran from Cleveland, Ohio to Leavittsburg, Ohio. The next station to the northwest was Geauga Lake, serving the Geauga Lake amusement park. The next station to the southeast was Mantua. The line was entirely acquired by the Erie Railroad in 1941 after dissolution of the New York, Pennsylvania and Ohio. The last train left Aurora station on January 14, 1977. After the line was abandoned, the rails were taken up. The station depot, one of three still standing along the branch (along with Solon and Mantua), was listed in the National Register of Historic Places on May 22, 1986.

References

Bibliography

Railway stations on the National Register of Historic Places in Ohio
Buildings and structures in Portage County, Ohio
National Register of Historic Places in Portage County, Ohio
Former Erie Railroad stations
Railway stations closed in 1977
Railway stations in the United States opened in 1872
1872 establishments in Ohio
Aurora, Ohio
Former railway stations in Ohio